Shankar Mahadev Bidari was the Director General and Inspector General of Police (DG&IGP) of the state of Karnataka. An Indian Police Service officer of 1978 batch, he was also the Commissioner of Police, Bangalore City. Bidari hails from Banahatti City in Bagalkot District, Karnataka. He was succeeded as DG & IGP by Abdul Rahman Infant in March 2012.

Family background
Shankar Bidari's family has a distinction of having five civil servants from a single family of six members. Bidari hails from a Lingayat family. Bidari's daughter Vijayalakshmi Bidari, IAS topped the Civil Services Examination for the year 2001. Her husband Mallikarjuna Prasanna, an IPS officer is a DCP in Mumbai. His son Vijayendra Bidari, an IPS officer is the current Deputy Joint Director of CBI of Delhi. His wife Rohini Bhajibhakare, IAS from Solapur is a probationer working as collector in Salem, Tamil Nadu. Shankar Bidari's wife Umadevi, who is a doctor by profession, is the only non-IAS and non-IPS person in the family.

Awards and honours
Dr  Shankar Bidari, I.P.S is the most highly decorated police officer in the state of Karnataka. He is decorated with :

 Karnataka Chief Minister’s Gold Medal in 1989
 Andhra Pradesh Mukyamantri Shourya Padakam in 1990.
 Karnataka Chief Minister’s Gold Medal for the 2nd time in 1991.
 The Police Medal for Gallantry in 1991.
 President’s Police Medal for Meritorious service in 1995.
 President’s Police Medal for Distinguished Service in 2003.
 First Bar to the Police Medal for Gallantry in 2011.

Many reputed institutions and associations all over the State have honoured him with titles like "Vishwashri", "Kayakashri", "Basawashri" award carrying a cash component of Rs.5 Lakhs by Shree Murga Mutt, Chitradurga in the year 2012 in recognition of his distinguished service to the society,  "Tippu Sultan Award", "Sri Vishveshwaraiah Award", "Pride of Karnataka", "Shishunala Shariff Award", "Kumara Rama Award", "Karnatakashri Award", "Mallikarjun Mansoor Award", "Sangolli Rayanna award", "Dr. Ambedkar Award".

Karnataka High Court Order set aside by the Supreme Court of India
On 30 March 2012, the Karnataka High Court, in response to a petition filed by the then senior most IPS officer of Karnataka DGP Abdul Rahman Infant challenging the appointment of Mr Shankar Bidari as Karnataka DG&IGP, struck down Mr Bidari’s appointment as the state DG&IGP.  The decision by the Karnataka High Court for removal of Bidari as DG&IGP was based on the decision taken by the Central Administrative Tribunal (CAT), Bangalore bench, on 16 March 2012, which quashed the appointment of Shankar M Bidari as DG&IGP of Karnataka. It then directed the Karnataka State Government to appoint Infant as DG&IGP of Karnataka on ad hoc basis.

He preferred an appeal in the Hon’ble Supreme Court which gave the judgment in his behalf by exonerating him of all the allegations and held that the order of the High Court is not correct and restored his honour. He retired from service after 34 years of distinguished service, in May 2012.

References

Living people
Indian police chiefs
People from Bagalkot
Karnataka Police
1954 births
Indian Police Service officers